Wazir Mansion railway station (Sindhi: وزير مينشن ريلوي اسٽيشن) is located in Karachi, Pakistan. The station has been used for transporting coal to other parts of the country. It is named for the nearby Wazir Mansion - birthplace of Pakistan's founder, Muhammad Ali Jinnah.

See also
 List of railway stations in Pakistan
 Pakistan Railways

References

External links

Railway stations in Karachi
Railway stations on Karachi Circular Railway